Ram Mohan Naidu Kinjarapu is an Indian politician and a Member of parliament to the 17th Lok Sabha from Srikakulam Lok Sabha constituency, Andhra Pradesh. He won the Indian general election, 2014 and 2019 as a Telugu Desam Party (TDP) candidate. He is also the National General Secretary of the TDP and the Leader of the Party in the Lok Sabha.

Early life 
Kinjarapu Ram Mohan Naidu was born in Nimmada, Srikakulam on 18 December 1987. He is the son of Kinjarapu Yerran Naidu; a Telugu Desam Party leader and Kinjarapu Vijayakumari. His father was a Member of Legislative Assembly (MLA) from Tekkali constituency and then became a Member of Parliament (MP) from Srikakulam and later served as a Union Minister for Rural Development in the United Front government between 1996 and 1998. He completed his primary schooling in Srikakulam and later on joined Delhi Public School, R. K. Puram, Delhi, to complete his school education after his father became an MP and moved to Delhi. He then earned a bachelor's degree in electrical engineering from Purdue University, United States and an MBA from Long Island University. He worked for a year in Singapore before returning to India. His uncle, Kinjarapu Atchannaidu, is also a politician.

Personal life 

Kinjarupu married Sravya Bandaru in June 2017, the youngest daughter of the former minister and Telugu Desam Party Vice-President, Bandaru Satyanarayana Murthy.

Political career 
Kinjarupu entered politics in 2012 after the death of his father. He now represents Srikakulam Parliamentary constituency. He was made the MP constituency in charge in 2013. In 2014, he contested the elections for Srikakulam Constituency and won with a margin of 127,576 votes. Kinjarupu is the second youngest Member of Parliament to the 16th Lok Sabha. He introduced a private members bill to draw the attention of the centre towards Andhra Pradesh Railway Zone with Vishakhapatnam as its headquarters.

Performance in Parliament 

Performance in the Lok Sabha, 2019-20

 Parliamentary Committees 

He is a member of the standing committee on Railways and Home Affairs, Consultative Committee on Ministry of Tourism and Culture and in the Committee on Welfare of other Backward Classes and Official Language Department in the 16th Loksabha.

 At the United Nations 

Kinjarapu has represented India at the 72nd session of the United Nations General Assembly in the 22nd meeting of the first committee on Disarmament. He emphasized on India's commitment to protecting the ideals of the UN charter and international peace through genuine pursuit for multilateralism. On behalf of India, he attached importance to productive measures in Nuclear Disarmament and Non- Proliferation in all aspects at the United Nations.  

 Politics For Impact 

Kinjarapu believes youth has a major role to play in politics, and politics isn't just about elections but, it's about solving the problems of people. With the same idea, he started an internship program, “Politics for Impact” to increase the opportunity for the youth to participate in politics and give them exposure to governance. 210 Students from over 16 states and 130 colleges had applied for the internship out of which 18 students were selected to work on issues in his constituency for a period of 2 months.

Election Results

 2014 elections 

 2019 elections 

Policy positions
In October 2019, he wrote an article in The News Minute'' strongly criticizing the Andhra Pradesh government under Y. S. Jagan Mohan Reddy for its sand mining policy. After coming to power in May 2019, sand mining was banned for more than 3 months until a new policy was put in place in September 2019. He wrote on how this policy "ended up putting more than 20 lakh laborers out of their daily jobs and caused deep pain to their families" and how it "brought the construction industry to a standstill for 3 months."

References

External links 
 

1987 births
Living people
India MPs 2014–2019
Telugu Desam Party politicians
People from Srikakulam district
Purdue University College of Engineering alumni
Long Island University alumni
Telugu politicians
Lok Sabha members from Andhra Pradesh